Xenopoecilus is a genus of small fish in the family Adrianichthyidae. All members of the genus are threatened and endemic to lakes in Sulawesi, Indonesia. Pollution and the introduction of other fish into the lakes are the main reasons for the fall in Xenopoecilus numbers.

Species
Today many authorities do not recognize this genus, instead including the three species in other genera:

 Egg-carrying buntingi (Xenopoecilus oophorus) – placed in genus Adrianichthys by FishBase.
 Popta's buntingi (Xenopoecilus poptae) – placed in genus Adrianichthys by FishBase.
 Xenopoecilus sarasinorum – placed in genus Oryzias by FishBase.

References

Adrianichthyidae
Taxonomy articles created by Polbot